The Dominica national football team is the national team of Dominica and is controlled by the Dominica Football Association. They are a member of CONCACAF.

Dominica has never qualified for the FIFA World Cup.

History

Beginnings

Dominica played its first international match in 1932, against Martinique, a match that ended in a 1–0 victory. In the 1940s they participated in the 1948 Coupe des Caraibes, losing in the preliminaries against Martinique 5–0 but qualified due to Trinidad and Tobago's withdrawal. In the competition proper, Dominica again faced Martinique, losing 6–0 and being eliminated.

In the 1960s and 1970s, Dominica played in several editions of the Windward Islands Tournament, winning the competition in 1971 with two 3–0 victories over Saint Vincent and Grenada, and a 2–2 draw against Saint Lucia. In the 1980s, Dominica regularly participated in the qualifying rounds of the CFU Championship, although they were unable to make it into the tournament proper.

1990s

After the creation of the Caribbean Cup in 1989, Dominica was only able to qualify for the group stage in the 1994 edition. They could not get past the first phase, after losing to the hosts Trinidad and Tobago 5–0 and Guadeloupe 4–0. They were only able to draw 1–1 with Barbados. They next qualified for the 1998 Caribbean Cup, being eliminated again in the first round, this time with three defeats against Martinique 5–1, Antigua and Barbuda 2–1 and Trinidad and Tobago 8–0. Dominica has not managed to return to the final phase of the Caribbean Cup since.

Dominica participated in World Cup qualification for the first time in the 1998 qualifiers beating Antigua and Barbuda in the first round (3–3 in Roseau and 1–3 in St. John's) before losing in the second phase to Barbados (1–0 in both Roseau and Bridgetown).

2000–present

In the 2002 qualifiers, the Pericos succumbed to Haiti 7–1 on aggregate, and in the 2006 qualifiers, after beating the Bahamas with an aggregate result of 4–2, the Dominicans faced the Mexican team that crushed them 10–0 in the first leg, then 8–0 at Aguascalientes. The decade would end with an elimination at the hands of Barbados, just like in 1996, this time as part of the 2010 qualifiers (1–1 in Roseau and 0–1 in Bridgetown).

On 15 October 2010, Dominica achieved the greatest victory in its history, beating the British Virgin Islands 10–0, with 5 goals from striker Kurlson Benjamin - in the first qualifying round of the 2010 Caribbean Cup. The following year, in the 2014 World Cup qualifiers, Dominica was drawn against Panama and Nicaragua. They lost all four of their games, failing to score a goal and conceding 11. They were eliminated from 2018 World Cup qualification by Canada, who beat them 6–0 over two legs.

Recent results and forthcoming fixtures

The following is a list of match results in the last 12 months, as well as any future matches that have been scheduled.

2022

2023

Coaching history

 Clifford Celaire (1996)
 Helmut Kosmehl (2000)
 Don Leogal (2004)
 Clifford Celaire (2005–2006)
 Christopher Ericson (2008–2009)
 Kurt Hector (2009–2013)
 Ronnie Gustave (2013-2014)
 Shane Marshall (2014–2017)
 Rajesh Latchoo (2017–2022)

Players

Current squad
The following players were called up for the 2022 FIFA World Cup qualification matches against Anguilla and Barbados on 2 and 9 June 2021.

Caps and goals correct as of 28 March 2021, after the match against Panama.

Recent call-ups

INJ Withdrew due to injury
PRE Preliminary squad / standby
RET Retired from the national team
SUS Serving suspension
WD Player withdrew from the squad due to non-injury issue.

Records

Players in bold are still active with Dominica.

Competition records

FIFA World Cup

CONCACAF Gold Cup

CONCACAF Nations League

Caribbean Cup

References

 
Caribbean national association football teams